The American School Foundation of Guadalajara is a bilingual private school offering academic programs in dual languages English and Spanish from primary to high school. Being the only U.S. State Department accredited school in Guadalajara, graduates passing out from the school receive both a Mexican and a U.S. Diploma. The Mexican Diploma is certified by the Universidad Nacional Autonóma de Mexico (UNAM) and the Secretaría de Educación Jalisco (SEJ) being the State’s Federal Institution in charge of Education.

History

The American School Foundation of Guadalajara was founded by Delia Walsh in 1908. The purpose of the small school was to educate the children of U.S. Railroad workers in Guadalajara during the construction of the Southern Pacific Railroad. In 1959, the school was then moved to its current campus, Colomos 2100 in the Colonia Italia Providencia area.

School Profile

The average yearly enrolment at ASFG is 1500 students. The student body is predominantly Mexican with a 75% of the student population. 13% are U.S. students with Mexican ties, and 12% are from Asian, Latin American and European countries. The faculty is recruited internationally, and locally too. The average faculty staff is 180 members.

Governance

The American School Foundation of Guadalajara, A.C., an “Asociación Civil” (non-profit organization), was formed and legally constituted on April 17, 1956. It is administered by a Board of Trustees and a Board of Directors. The Board of Trustees is considered the maximum authority of the Association under the law, and the Board of Directors is in charge of monitoring the overall operations of the school.

Accreditations and Affiliations

ASFG has accreditations and affiliations from the following educational organisations and associations:
 ASFG is a U.S. State Department, Office of Overseas Schools, sponsored educational institution
 Association of American Schools in Mexico (ASOMEX)
 Association of Schools in Mexico, the Caribbean, Central America and Colombia (Tri Association)
 AdvancED
 Association for the Advancement of International Education (AAIE)
 National Association of Independent Schools (NAIS)
 Association of Supervision and Curriculum Development (ASCD)
 National Association of Secondary School Principals (NASSP)
 National Staff Development Council (NSDC / Learning Forward)
 College Board
 North American Reggio Emilia Alliance (NAREA)
 National Science Teacher Association (NSTA)
 National Council of Teachers of Mathematics (NCTM)
 International Reading Association (IRA)
 National Council of Teachers of English (NCTE)
 International Society for Technology in Education (ISTE)
 Advanced Placement Honors Program

External links
 ASFG Official Website

American international schools in Mexico
High schools in Mexico
International schools in the Guadalajara Metropolitan Area
Guadalajara, Jalisco
Private schools in Mexico